The 1969 San Francisco Giants season was the Giants' 87th season  in Major League Baseball, their 12th season  in San Francisco since their move from New York following the 1957 season, and their tenth at Candlestick Park. The team finished second in the newly established National League West Division with a record of 90–72, 3 games behind the Atlanta Braves, their fifth consecutive season of finishing second. The Giants set a Major League record which still stands for the most double plays grounded into by a team in a single game, with 7 against the Houston Astros on May 4.

Offseason 
 October 14, 1968: Jesús Alou was drafted from the Giants by the Montreal Expos as the 13th pick in the 1968 MLB expansion draft.
 December 6, 1968: Nate Oliver was traded by the Giants to the New York Yankees for Charley Smith.
 March 16, 1969, Giants pitching prospect Néstor Chávez was killed in a plane crash
 March 28, 1969: Charley Smith was purchased from the Giants by the Chicago Cubs.

Regular season 
 July 20, 1969: Pitcher Gaylord Perry hit the first home run of his career (he hit 6). It was in the third inning off pitcher Claude Osteen.

Season standings

Record vs. opponents

Opening Day starters 
 Bobby Bonds
 Dick Dietz
 Bobby Etheridge
 Jim Ray Hart
 Ron Hunt
 Hal Lanier
 Juan Marichal
 Willie Mays
 Willie McCovey

Notable transactions 
 August 8, 1969: The Giants traded a player to be named later to the Detroit Tigers for Don McMahon. The Giants completed the deal by sending César Gutiérrez to the Tigers on September 2.

Roster

Player stats

Batting

Starters by position 
Note: Pos = Position; G = Games played; AB = At bats; R = Runs scored; H = Hits; Avg. = Batting average; HR = Home runs; RBI = Runs batted in; SB = Stolen bases

Other batters 
Note: G = Games played; AB = At bats; R = Runs scored; H = Hits; Avg. = Batting average; HR = Home runs; RBI = Runs batted in; SB = Stolen bases

Pitching

Starting pitchers 
Note: G = Games pitched; GS = Games started; IP = Innings pitched; W = Wins; L = Losses; ERA = Earned run average; BB = Walks allowed; SO = Strikeouts

Other pitchers 
Note: G = Games pitched; IP = Innings pitched; W = Wins; L = Losses; ERA = Earned run average; SO = Strikeouts

Relief pitchers 
Note: G = Games pitched; IP = Innings pitched; W = Wins; L = Losses; SV = Saves; ERA = Earned run average; SO = Strikeouts

Awards and honors 

All-Star Game

Farm system

Notes

References 
 1969 San Francisco Giants team at Baseball-Reference
 1969 San Francisco Giants team page at Baseball Almanac

San Francisco Giants seasons
San Francisco Giants season
San Fran